The Athletics Integrity Unit (AIU) was founded by the International Association of Athletics Federations in April 2017 to combat doping in the sport of athletics. The unit functions fully independently from the IAAF. It is currently led by head Brett Clothier. The organization collected more than 600 blood samples prior to the 2017 World Championships in Athletics.

Asbel Kiprop case 
The AIU was the first official source to confirm Asbel Kiprop's positive test for the banned substance EPO in May 2018. They affirmed the validity of the test despite accusations of a tampered sample.

After testing positive for the banned substance, other allegations against Kiprop came to light. To the charges of adultery, alcohol abuse, sexual impropriety, and doping, Kiprop admitted guilt. "I made some mistakes in life, and I have always taken the consequences," admitted Kiprop

References

External links 
 Official website

Athletics organizations
Sports organizations established in 2017